Ebrahimabad (also Romanized as Ebrāhīmābād) is a village in Asgariyeh Rural District, in the Central District of Pishva County, Tehran Province, Iran. At the 2006 census, its population was 26, in 7 families.

References 

Populated places in Pishva County